The 1948–49 Ranji Trophy was the 15th season of the Ranji Trophy. Bombay won the title defeating Baroda in the final. The semi-final match between Bombay and Maharashtra was the highest-scoring first-class match of all time. A total of 2,376 runs were scored, including nine centuries.

Highlights

 B. B. Nimbalkar scored 443 not out for Maharashtra v Kathiawar at Poona. It was the second highest individual score in first class cricket at the time and still the highest by an Indian cricketer. Nimbalkar was nine runs behind Don Bradman's record at lunch on the third day but Kathiawar conceded the match at this point. 
 Maharashtra's 826 for 4 was the second highest team total in Ranji trophy at the time.
 The Zonal format was not used in the 1948–49 season of Ranji Trophy. It was the only time that this was done until the zones were replaced by the Elite and Plate divisions in 2002–03
 The Bombay v Maharashtra semifinal produced 2376 runs, in the most in any first class match. Bombay's total of 1365 runs is the record for a team in any first class match
 Three batsmen – Uday Merchant 143 & 156, Dattu Phadkar 131 & 160 and Madhusudan Rege 133 & 100 – uniquely scored hundreds in both innings.
 The semifinals and finals were timeless matches. Both the Bombay – Maharashtra semifinal and the Bombay – Baroda final went into the seventh day, 
 Three of the four semifinalists were from the West Zone.
 Assam made their Ranji Trophy debut in this season against United Provinces.

Draw

Top half

Bottom half

Final

Scorecards and averages
Cricketarchive

References

External links
 Series home at ESPN Cricinfo

1949 in Indian cricket
Indian domestic cricket competitions